Gisela von Arnim (also Giesela; August 30, 1827 in Berlin – April 4, 1889 in Florence) was a German writer, mainly of fairy tales.

Biography 
Gisela was the youngest child of Achim and Bettina von Arnim. She was not formally educated, being taught only by her sisters.  In her youth she read fairy tales and Romantic poetry, especially the works of Wilhelm Hauff, and began to write fairy tales herself.  With her sisters she started the "Kaffeter circle", first a group for young women and later a full literary salon also including men (honorary members included Hans Christian Andersen and Emmanuel Geibel).  In 1859, she married the Germanist and art historian Herman Grimm, a son of Wilhelm Grimm.

Works 
 Das Leben der Hochgräfin Gritta von Rattenzuhausbeiuns (with Bettina von Arnim)
 Mondkönigs Tochter
 Aus den Papieren eines Spatzen
 Das Licht
 Die gelbe Haube
 Dramatische Werke (collection)

References 

 

1827 births
1889 deaths
German people of Italian descent
Gisela
19th-century German women writers
19th-century German writers
German salon-holders